Tritonia may refer to: 

 Tritonia (plant)
 Tritonia (gastropod)
 Tritonia Academic Library
 in musical scale analysis, possessing tritones 
 in Greek mythology, an epithet for Athena
 The first practical atmospheric diving suit, developed in 1922 as the first in the JIM suit series
 a radio show hosted by the electronic music group Tritonal

Genus disambiguation pages